Atsiki is a village and a former municipality on the island of Lemnos, North Aegean, Greece. Since the 2011 local government reform it is part of the municipality Lemnos, of which it is a municipal unit. It is located in the northern central part of the island and has a land area of 134.672 km², covering about 28.2% of the island's surface. The municipal seat was the town of Atsikí (pop. 848 at the 2011 census). Its next largest town is Ágios Dimítrios (812). The municipal unit's total population is 2,535 inhabitants.

References

Populated places in Lemnos